Erik Skoglund may refer to:

 Erik Skoglund (swimmer) (1903–1984), Swedish swimmer
 Erik Skoglund (boxer) (born 1991), Swedish boxer

See also
 Eric Skoglund (born 1992), American baseball pitcher